The SKM Park is an amusement park and outlet in Cianjhen District, Kaohsiung, Taiwan. It is owned by Shin Kong Mitsukoshi. SKM Park is positioned as an "international lifestyle complex" with restaurants, lifestyle theme stores, and entertainment and lifestyle facilities in a semi-open-air shopping area.

History
The park was opened on 9 May 2016 during a grand opening ceremony attended by Taroko Group officials and Kaohsiung Mayor Chen Chu.

On 26 January 2022, Taroko Park was reopened under the name of SKM Park and officially transformed into an outlet mall.

Location
The park spreads over an area of 87,120 m2. It features a 600-meter long circuit race track covering an area of 30,000 m2. The shopping center consists of more than 200 retailers built with European architecture style. 

The park is accessible from exit 2 of the Caoya Station of Kaohsiung MRT.

See also
 List of tourist attractions in Taiwan
 E-Da Outlet Mall
 Dream Mall
 Hanshin Arena Shopping Plaza

References

External links

  

2016 establishments in Taiwan
Amusement parks in Kaohsiung
Shopping malls in Kaohsiung